Tian Zhong (born 1956) is a vice-admiral (zhong jiang) of the People's Liberation Army Navy (PLAN) of China. He has been deputy commander of the PLAN since 2014, and formerly served as commander of the North Sea Fleet.

Early life
Tian Zhong was born in 1956 in Huanghua, Hebei Province.

Career
Zhong joined the PLAN in 1974; he attained the rank of rear admiral in 2001 and vice-admiral in 2009.

From December 2007 to January 2014, Tian served as commander of the North Sea Fleet as well as deputy commander of the Jinan Military Region. He became deputy commander of the PLA Navy in January 2014, and Rear Admiral Qiu Yanpeng succeeded him as commander of the North Sea Fleet.

Tian Zhong was a member of the 18th Central Committee of the Communist Party of China.

References

1956 births
Living people
People's Liberation Army generals from Hebei
People from Cangzhou
People's Liberation Army Navy admirals
Commanders of the North Sea Fleet
Members of the 18th Central Committee of the Chinese Communist Party